María Mendive (born April 1968) is a Uruguayan actress, theater director, broadcaster, and teacher.

Biography
Since 2001 she has been a founder, director, and professor of the Instituto de Actuación de Montevideo (IAM), along with the actresses Gabriela Iribarren and Marisa Bentancur. She works in advertising, lending her image and voice.

Filmography
 2009, Acassuso (director)
 2013,  (television)
 2013, Anina 
 2012, El día de la familia
 2016, Era el cielo

References

External links
 
 

1968 births
21st-century Uruguayan actresses
Living people
Uruguayan educators
Uruguayan stage actresses
Uruguayan television actresses
Uruguayan women educators